The Laotian Chinese are Laotian citizens of Han Chinese ancestry. They constitute one of the many Overseas Chinese residing in Southeast Asia. At present, they constitute an estimated 1 to 2 percent of the Laotian population. The Laotian Chinese community have a disproportionately large presence in the Laotian business sector and dominate the Laotian economy today.

Identity
Many modern Laotian Chinese have reinvented themselves to assert a more traditional Chinese identity to more easily create economic links to conduct business between Laos and Mainland China.

Language

Many Laotian Chinese families have their children learn Chinese to reaffirm their Chinese identity as Mandarin has been increasingly the primary language of business for Overseas Chinese business communities. The rise of China's global economic prominence has prompted many Laotian Chinese business families to see Mandarin as a beneficial asset to partake economic links to conduct business between Laos and Mainland China.

Migration history
Most Laotian Chinese are descendants of older generations who moved down from the Southern China provinces from the 19th century and present. Most have ancestry from the provinces of: Yunnan, Guangdong, Guangxi, Sichuan and Guizhou. Laotian Chinese mostly speak Teochew and Cantonese, but some also speak Southwestern Mandarin from the Chinese provinces of Yunnan, Sichuan and Guizhou. Today in Laos, many ethnic Chinese migrants have decided to reside in Laos, making the population rise by a couple of thousands. Many ethnic Chinese were also involved in constructing the 2009 Southeast Asian Games venues held in Vientiane. During the 1970s and 1980s, after the Communist Pathet Lao came into power, some Laotian Chinese fled to Thailand and other countries. The U.S. also has a significant Laotian Chinese population. Many still practice certain Chinese traditions and customs as their ancestors did. Most of the ethnic Chinese in Laos fled the country during the Communist takeover in 1975.

Trade and industry

Like much of Southeast Asia, the Chinese dominate Laotian commerce at every level of society. The Laotian Chinese wield tremendous economic clout over their indigenous Laotian majority counterparts and play a critical role in maintaining the country's economic vitality and prosperity. In Laos, which has almost no indigenous commercial culture in the private sector, the 1 to 2 percent Chinese minority more or less comprise 100 percent of the country's entire business community while profiting eagerly from every grudging inch of globalization induced market opening. Many Laotian entrepreneurs and investors of Chinese ancestry play a leading role in the Laotian economy specializing in diverse industry sectors such as shipping, textiles, mining, casinos, bars, nightclubs, banking, construction, airlines, real estate, tobacco manufacturing, fashion, health clubs, catering, hotels, cement mixing, restaurants, automobile dealerships, electrical appliances, machinery, retail stores, and repair shops. In Vientiane alone, Chinese real estate investors are the dominant power players in Vietiane's property market as are numerous Chinese real estate developers who are behind some of Vientiane's largest property development projects. The Northern section of Kaysone Phomvihane Road is home to numerous Chinese retailers and houses the Chinese-built National Convention Center. ASEM Villa and Don Chan Palace, two of the largest and most prestigious five-star hotels in Vientiane are well known establishments recognized for accommodating expatriate Chinese businessmen. This precedent is eclipsed by the apparent economic influence presided by numerous Chinese state-owned enterprises, two of which happen to be China Railway Group and PowerChina, where both companies are collaborating on numerous infrastructure projects throughout Laos. 

Chinese economic dominance of Laos dates back to the medieval Southeast Asian caravan trade that involved the integration of the medieval Lao Kingdom of Lan Xang into medieval Southeast Asia's regional trade network stemming from its establishment in 1354. By the end of the fifteenth century, the Kingdom of Lan Xang gained its economic efflorescence as a result of the prosperity engendered by the Southeast Asian caravan trade. Expatriate Hui caravan merchants and traders acted as intermediaries between the Laotian highland and lowland as their commercial activities of supplying and collecting from the Laotian highland energized the Kingdom's economy alongside the various Southeast Asian trade routes in addition to reaping the economic prosperity presided by the Chinese which acted as a major tax revenue stream for the Lan Xang monarchy. Numerous goods were traded on the Lanxang and international market ranging from medicinal plants, resins, benzoin, timber, and ivory. In the 19th century precipated by Qing rebellions, political upheavals, and dynastic conflicts sent waves of Han Chinese into Central and Southern Laos. Many of the Han immigrants whom eventually settled down in Vietiane, Pakse, Savannakhet, and Thakhek traced their ancestry to the Southern Chinese provinces of Fujian, Guangdong, and Hainan. Starting off their humble migrant beginnings as coolies for the French Colonial Empire in Laos, the Chinese soon began to flourish and eventually dominated the Laotian economy based on the Confucian paradigm of networking. In order to secure and protect their economic interests, the Chinese banded together to what the French colonialists denoted as congrégations (huiguan 会馆 or bang 帮). The French colonial economic structure utilized as an instrument to extract agricultural produce and the distribution of rudimentary consumer goods was nonetheless heavily dependent on the massive web of business networks controlled by the Chinese middlemen. Laotian entrepreneurs of Chinese ancestry purchased, wholesaled, traded, imported, and exported everything of economic value across the French Indo-Chinese colonies. Dominating the Indo-Chinese trade, the Chinese began to act as compradors for French colonial trading cooperatives as economic preponderance prompted Laotian businessmen of Chinese ancestry to act as financial intermediaries and operating as agents for the French as well as their own. Even more indicative of Chinese economic prowess was their control of the massive system of financial services networks across French Indo-China. One of the earliest modern forms of Laotian Chinese commodities trading was the purchase of indigenous Lao products from the Laotian countryside, which were then in turn, wholesaled to Laotian Chinese merchants and exporters in the urban areas of Laos. In the constituent domain of international finance and trade within Laos, the Chinese occupy a significant position, with much of the Laotian Chinese commercial activities having been extensively pervasive, as they control 75 percent of Lao's foreign trade in addition to presiding much of the Overseas Chinese investment capital, largely concentrated in 3 of the 4 major Laotian banks. In heavy industry, the Chinese dominate the Laotian industrial manufacturing sector, with dozens of Chinese-owned Laotian industrial manufacturing establishments involved in the production of plastics, monosodium glutamate, textiles, laundry detergent powder, nails, sheet metal, matches, ice, and beverages in addition to the Chinese possessing 70 percent of Laos's aggregate sawmill production capabilities.   

In most towns across contemporary Northern Laos, much of the local commercial activity has come under Chinese control. In Luang Namtha in northern Laos, recent Chinese migrants dominate the local markets and have established large agricultural estates. In the city of Luang Prabang, the largest hotel and the city's lone shopping mall are all owned by Laotian investors of Chinese ancestry. In other places such as Boten bordering near the Golden Triangle Special Economic Zone, large Chinese enclaves have sprung up with parts of the city being converted into areas of attraction to lure tourists, foreign investors, and gamblers. A number of expatriate Chinese merchants, traders, dealers, investors, as well as prostitutes have settled down in Golden Boten City. Golden Boten City which initially housed a large casino that has since been abandoned, has experienced an upsurge in large-scale construction of hotels and other commercial properties. In the mutual rural-urban vicinities of Northern Laos, a massive influx of Chinese merchants and traders have come to dominate its regional economy following the integration of the Overseas Chinese bamboo network, which was interwoven with key areas including trade nodes encompassing restaurants, marketplaces, and guesthouses. Throughout 2005 to 2006, Chinese merchants and traders have become the dominant players as they carved out new market induced niches across Oudomxay, Muang Sing, and Luang Namtha by setting up shops peddling fashion, cosmetics, consumer goods, electrical appliances, and various foods. In various parts of Northern Laos, Chinese merchants and traders have set up small petty shops and dealerships hawking and supplying cheap Chinese goods and services to the indigenous Laotians in the urban and rural areas. Many of these Chinese-owned establishments range from mobile phone sale centers, electrical items, automobile and tractor engines, television and home furniture sets, barbershops, and beauty salons are found in numerous urban centers and high streets across Northern Laos. As more Chinese traders poured into various cities in Laos, supplying cheap Chinese goods to the local indigenous Laotians, have transformed them into the garishingly prosperous urban trading centers that they are today, signified by the plethora of Chinese-owned and dominated markets, shops, restaurants, and guesthouses. Though most shops specialize in one product area, it is not uncommon for Laotian businessmen and investors of Chinese ancestry to be involved in multiple trade and industry domains such as shipping, even though the primary area of business focus may be a motorcycle dealership or a banana plantation. Moreover, a rising number of hotels, guesthouses, bed-and-breakfast lodges, and restaurants have emerged to accommodate the needs of expatriate Chinese merchants, traders, workers, and tourists. These key establishments and joint stops operating as tourist information centers, dealmaking hubs, mah-jong gambling houses, bus ticket offices, intermediaries, private buses, and meeting rooms have served as crucial nodes and junctures that are interconnected with the wider Overseas Chinese transnational bamboo network operating across Southeast Asia. Guesthouses and restaurants have been established as key stop areas for Chinese tourists. Like their Chinese shop-owner counterparts, guesthouse and restaurant owners often engage in other commercial activities by blending in other additional service offerings such as transportation, shopkeeping, clinics, or rubber production. In addition, the owners have also operated as subcontractors and supervisors for prominent expatriate Chinese investors. The Chinese also pioneered the Laotian agricultural sector whereby acting as intermediaries and agents for Mainland Chinese farming companies, have played a major role in the growth and expansion of numerous Laotian agribusinesses ranging from rubber manufacturing, sugarcane farms, fertilizers and seed provisions, dealing with customs, as well as supplying and transporting finished agricultural products to indigenous Laotian farmers at superior pricing rates.  In Oudomxay, Muang Sing and Luang Namth, Chinese fruit traders dominate the local food markets and have established themselves as the chief suppliers of food to the local Chinese restaurants, displacing indigenous Laotian farmers with cheaper Chinese fruit and vegetable imports in the process. The Chinese are also heavily involved the Laotian agricultural export trade, investing much of their incoming capital in lucrative cash crops such as maize, corn, bananas, cassava, sesame, watermelon and soy beans. Many of these lucrative cash crop exports are produced on farmland rented to Chinese companies along with the plantations that are also owned by them in addition to the inputs supplied by Chinese consumers. 

The present situation in Laos has led to a resurgence of the Laotian Chinese business community as a result of then Chinese Premier Li Peng's state visit to Vientiane in 1990, increasing trade from Mainland China as well as the presence of foreign direct investment activity from Overseas Chinese investors in the neighboring Southeast Asian countries. New waves of Han Chinese migration to Laos since the 1990s have led to the resurgence of economic influence long held by the Chinese, many of whom have started their own businesses by operating as small shopkeepers, traders, and hawkers involving in numerous industry sectors in shipping, transportation, computer hardware, household supplies, motorcycle repair, cell phone shops, hotels, restaurants, and beauty salons. In order for the community to secure and protect their economic interests, numerous Laotian Chinese entrepreneurs and investors conduct business via the Association of Chinese, who are responsible for acclimating recent immigrant Chinese or fellow Laotian Chinese entrepreneurs and investors. Laos’s lack of an indigenous Lao commercial culture in the private sector that is dominated entirely by Laotian Chinese themselves has encouraged a significant inflow of Mainland Chinese foreign investment capital into the country. The modern Laotian business sector is highly dependent on Mainland Chinese and Laotian Chinese-owned companies who control virtually the country's entire economy. An influx of capital from Mainland China has led to new construction projects in northern Laos with hydraulic infrastructures, prospecting, high-yield plantations, and textile factories. Of particular note of regard is Mainland China's role in the Laotian economy, which has remained as the foremost provider of foreign Chinese investment into Laos as the presence of Chinese investments in Laos is glaringly perceptible as most Laotian companies and investors that conduct business internationally mainly deal with Laotian, Mainland, and Overseas Chinese investors, who dominate Laotian commerce. In 2007, China became Lao's premiere foreign investor, toppling Vietnam and Thailand, with much of the $2.71 billion USD worth of foreign direct investment capital making its way into hydropower plant development, mining, shopping centers, restaurants, hotels, banks, rubber plantations, and telecommunications. In 2014, China became the largest source of foreign direct investment in Laos totaling some $5.1 billion USD. Much of the influx of incoming investment capital went into Laos's mining industries, particularly salt, zinc, iron, gold, copper, and bauxite. Chinese state-owned enterprises such as China National Materials Group, Yuqida Mining Group, China Nonferrous Metal Mining Group, and Aluminum Corporation of China Limited have established a major presence in the Laotian mining sector, taking part in the exploration, extraction, and exploitation of bauxite in the Bolaven Plateau. Other Chinese state-owned firms including Sinohydro and Shougang Group's subsidiary, Qin Huang Dao Xin He Steel and Mining Development have made development forays in the extraction of iron ore across the Nam Ngum River. In 2018, Mainland China accounted for 79 percent of aggregate foreign direct investment into Laos. Chief Chinese investors are Chinese state-owned enterprises and some of Mainland China's largest private companies have established a major presence in Laos's agricultural, utility, mining, and hospitality industries. Other commercial industry sectors include casinos, rubber production, tobacco processing, motorbike assemblage, and warehouses. In 2020, Chinese investment in Laos continued to rise, amounting to an aggregate sum totalling $16 billion USD since 1989.

See also

 Chinese folk religion in Southeast Asia
 People's Republic of China – Laos relations

References

External links
Calgary Lao-Chinese Association

Ethnic groups in Laos